Jeanne Fleming is an American Celebration Artist from New York City, who organized the Harbor Festival Fair in 1986, the Official Land Celebration for the Centennial of the Statue of Liberty and who is currently director of New York's Village Halloween Parade.

Fleming uses pageant-sized puppets – giant rod puppets operated by teams of puppeteers. For Liberty's party in 1986, she "...invited all the great statues of the world to her birthday party and created giant puppets to represent them.  Each one arrived accompanied by native music," Fleming explained.  The centennial extravaganza lasted three days and drew 12 million people, and is said to have been the largest public event in the US as of that date.

Parade director

Fleming took responsibility for continuing the Village Halloween Parade in 1985 after its founding artistic director, Ralph Lee, decided to no longer run the event. Fleming had been working with Lee since 1983 and had been a participant in the parade for several years prior to that. In addition to producing new puppets and processional elements, Fleming planned for its future growth by working with five Manhattan neighborhoods' community boards, local police, residents, sponsors, schools, and community organizations. The parade currently draws two million spectators and sixty thousand participants. 

For the Halloween Parade, Fleming commissions puppet artists to develop and depict annual themes that explore the holiday's historic origins as well as concepts of its psychic, spiritual, and mythical meanings, focusing on selected aspects from year to year. Themes often reflect the notion of Halloween as a night of transformation, as well as ideas of self-expression and community.

In 2001, New York City government and police allowed Fleming to produce the second large-scale event in NYC to take place after the September 11 attacks (the first was the Columbus Day Parade on October 8). Parade puppet designer Sophia Michahelles developed the theme of "Phoenix Rising” (a reference to the mythical bird that rises up out of its own ashes). For the event, Michahelles created a giant illuminated Phoenix surrounded by lanterns representing the towers.

Other work

Celebration Artist and Producer, Jeanne Fleming and her company Wonderworks have been designing and producing programs, festivals, commercial and non-commercial events since 1970.

At 25, Fleming was awarded an experimental grant from the National Endowment for the Arts which she used to create and direct the first regional cooperative arts program in the nation. Under this program, which involved the thirty colleges in the Mid-Hudson area of New York, Fleming designed and produced yearly festivals in art, music, drama, dance, film, poetry, the culinary arts, and video. The festivals involved residencies of many major artists across different disciplines. The program also included a cross-discipline arts touring program funded by the National Endowment for the Arts and the New York State Council on the Arts.

Fleming has worked not only as a consultant in establishing cooperative arts programs, but also as a festival designer and producer. She has designed or produced events including private parties, events for hotels and small towns, movie shoots, and commercial events, and major New York City and international events. Having graduated with a BA from Bard College in Medieval Studies, most of Fleming's original event designs involve themes requiring historical and literary research.

Events she has designed include the largest event ever to be held in the nation, The Harbor Festival '86, which was the Official New York City Public Celebration for the Centennial of the Statue of Liberty. This three-day event drew 12 million people and involved the construction of 9 major stages, over 3,000 performers, 10 parades daily, dozens of special events, the construction of over 400 specially designed vendor booths and a staff of close to 500 people.

She was the designer and producer for  "Walking On Air," a festival for the Grand Opening of the Walkway Over the Hudson in Poughkeepsie, NY.   As designed, the Walking On Air event was regional in focus and consisted of a year of educational and creative visual arts programs with 50 communities on both sides of the Hudson River in Dutchess and Ulster Counties, NY. It culminated in 2 days of celebrations including a Grand Parade and an International VIP Grand Opening Ceremony.

In 2008, she re-designed and produced "Sinterklaas! An Old Dutch Tradition in Rhinebeck." Originally conceived by Fleming in 1985, the project includes a Children’s Torchlight Parade, dozens of workshops, performances, and events.	

Between 1996-99 she directed the 650th Anniversary of the town of Nowy Targ, Poland, a month-long program involving American and Balinese craftsmen in puppet construction culminating in a procession for the World Bamboo Festival in Bali, an Iroko Tree Ceremony with the Mothers-of-Saint from Bahia, Brazil, and "The Making, Baking and Breaking of Bread," a community project that involved the construction of a working replica of a Medieval community bread oven, "Presente de Yemanjá," a tribute to the Hudson River on the historic Rokeby Estate in Barrytown, NY and based on African/Brazilian traditions, "Ogun," a tribute to the forests of the Hudson Valley, and "Ibeiji––A Celebration of Twins." She also designed Flash of the Spirit, an Arts-in-Education Program that explores African and Afro-American Cultures.

In 1993 she created an ongoing major tourism agenda for New York City called HALLOWEEK which involves 55 public, private and business sponsors for a week-long series of Halloween-related events, including "safe-zones’’ for children in the City to trick-or-treat. This tourism initiative is funded by the Manhattan Borough President and the NYC Mayor’s Office of Tourism.
 
In addition to the events above, she has designed and produced Independence Day 1984 and 1985 for New York City, New York’s Village Halloween Parade (1982-to present), the 42nd St. River to River Festival, A Special Night on 53rd Street, and major events for small towns including the 300th Anniversary of the Town of Rhinebeck, N.Y. which involved six months of special programs, culminating in an old time country fair. Wonderworks has been involved in 6 projects for children: Kidsarts in the Apple, a two-day festival celebrating the creativity of city kids and the myriad arts-in-education programs in New York City, the 20th Anniversary Retrospective of the Touchstone Center for Children which involved conferences, special events, and publications, Let the River Connect Us, an award-winning Arts in Education program funded by the New York State Council on the Arts in the Rhinebeck Central School System that involved video, painting, sculpture, poetry, theater, music and Native American culture. She also assisted the International Catholic Children's Bureau in designing two national conferences: "Children and AIDS and Creativity: A Step Toward Spiritual Growth in the Child" for the Cathedral of St. John the Divine in NYC Mothers and Daughters, a Midsummer Celebration, "Simple Beauty," an Arts in Education program that taught children the most advanced theories in physics through the arts, a spring event for Belvedere Castle in New York's Central Park, and the "Festa dos Ibeji" celebration of children (particularly twins).

Wonderworks has also designed and produced numerous smaller events. For example, it produced the Opening Parade Event for the 2005 Tribeca Film Festival, and a series of Special Weekends for the Mohonk Mountain House in New Paltz, NY including a Murder Mystery Weekend with Edward Gorey and Isaac Asimov, a Chamber Music Weekend, Explore the Tiny (Small is Beautiful), Star Parties with Carl Sagan, a Chocolate Lover’s event, and many more events at the Mountain House.

Fleming has given the keynote address at the Henson International Puppetry Festival, the national conference of the Association of College, and the University and Community Arts Administrators (ACUCAA). She has given lectures at New York University, Sarah Lawrence College, Bard College, and the Omega Institute on festivals, celebrations, and processional art. She also taught in the Gifted Students Program at the Rhinebeck High School and worked with local teenagers on the design, fund-raising, and realization of a much needed teen center.

Articles and essays on her work have appeared in Design Quarterly, The Journal of American Folklore, the NYU Performance Studies Journal, The New Yorker, The New York Times, and Puppetry International. She has been named “New Yorker of the Week” by both Time Warner NY1 News and New York Newsday and has had a profile in the NY Times. A book has been written about New York’s Village Halloween Parade entitled Masked Culture as well as numerous scholarly articles. Many documentaries about the Halloween Parade have been made over the years, and in 2007 a special segment was produced by The History Channel.

In addition to the design and production of events, Fleming has acted as a consultant to arts councils, not-for-profits, schools, towns, states and events. When not producing events, Fleming writes and directs her own large-scale outdoor theater pieces, is a storyteller, and has shown her original fashion designs at All American Craft Enterprises exhibitions, the Philadelphia Museum of Art, and the Smithsonian Institution.

She lives in New York’s Hudson Valley with her husband and son.

See also
 New York's Village Halloween Parade

Sources
New York's Village Halloween Parade Official Site
Faculty page at Omega Institute
Sinterklaas Rhinebeck Official Site
Huffington Post Article on Sinterklaas

American puppeteers
Year of birth missing (living people)
Living people